Dylan Smith (born in Montreal) is a Canadian actor known for his portrayal of the characters Sepp on TNT's I Am the Night, Jasper in Maze Runner: The Death Cure, Daniel in Lemonade, and Largo Brandyfoot in The Lord of the Rings: The Rings of Power.

Early life 
Dylan Smith is the son of Academy Award-nominated film director John N. Smith, and documentarian, Academy Award winner, and member of the Royal Canadian Academy of Arts Cynthia Scott.

He grew up playing ice hockey, getting a sports scholarship for college, but after an injury that made him change his career, he studied Theater at the University of Toronto.  There, he joined the Soulpepper Theatre Company.

Career 
Smith continued studying acting at Webber Douglas in London, England, where he took leading roles in TV shows like the British classic EastEnders, and in films such as Murder On The Orient Express.

Smith was cast in Private Lives on Broadway. There he met his wife, British theatre director Anna Ledwich.

In his early work, Smith portrayed secondary characters in films like 300 (2006), Immortals (2011), and Total Recall (2012).
 
In 2016, Smith played the role of Lakan in Hulu film Dawn, and Tristam Blanchard in the BBC TV series Ripper Street.

In 2017, he portrayed the pilot in the film The Mummy, and Jenkins in the TV series Into the Badlands.

In 2018, his main roles were Jasper in Maze Runner: The Death Cure, and Daniel in Lemonade, a drama from Cristian Mungiu.

In 2019, Smith played the character of Sepp on TNT's I Am the Night.

In 2022, Smith played the Harfoot Largo Brandyfoot in the Prime Video series The Lord of the Rings: The Rings of Power.

References

External links 

21st-century Canadian male actors
20th-century Canadian male actors
Living people
Year of birth missing (living people)
Canadian male film actors
Canadian male television actors
Male actors from Montreal